Choudhary Khush Akhtar Subhani was a Pakistani politician who had been a member of the Provincial Assembly of the Punjab since August 2018 to 31 May 2021. Subhani was born in a prominent Vario family of Gujjars. His father, Chaudhry Akhtar Ali Vario, was a prominent politician and landlord of Sialkot who was a Provincial Minister of Punjab, MPA, and Member of National Assembly of Pakistan several times.

Political career

He was elected to Provincial Assembly of the Punjab as candidate of IJI from PP 104 Sialkot in 1990 Pakistan general elections and was made Chairman Standing committee on Food. He took 42,960 votes and defeated Idrees Bajwa a candidate of PDA.

He was re-elected to provincial Assembly of Punjab as candidate of PML-J in 1993 Pakistan general elections and became minister for Population Welfare & Prisons, Housing & Physical planning and Environmental Planning. He got 39,579 votes and defeated Ch. Muhammad Aslam a PML-N candidate who got 27,463 votes. During this term after the Chief Minister Manzoor Wattoo was unseated, PMLJ nominated Subhani for the top office in Punjab, but his nomination papers were rejected due to him not meeting the minimum age limit. In return Sardar Arif Nakai was nominated and made the Chief Minister of Punjab.

He was again elected to Provincial Assembly of the Punjab in 2002 general elections from PP-125 (Sialkot V) constituency as candidate of PML Q. He defeated Tahir Mehmood Hundli a candidate of PPP.He ran for the seat of Provincial Assembly of the Punjab in 2008 general elections from PP-125 but lost the seat to Ch Tahir Mehmood Hundli a PPP candidate. He was elected to the Provincial Assembly of the Punjab for 4th term as a candidate of Pakistan Muslim League (N) from Constituency PP-38 (Sialkot-IV) in 2018 Pakistani general election. He got 57636 votes in the 2018 general election.

Death
He died on Sunday May 30, 2021. He was suffering from liver disorders and was admitted at a hospital in Lahore.

References

2021 deaths
Punjab MPAs 2018–2023
Pakistan Muslim League (N) MPAs (Punjab)
Year of birth missing